Wavelet noise is an alternative to Perlin noise which reduces the problems of aliasing and detail loss that are encountered when Perlin noise is summed into a fractal.

External links
 Wavelet Noise Paper at pixar.com.

Computer graphics
Noise (graphics)